Titho is a  small village on the bank of a canal in Rohtas district of Bihar state in east India.it has a population of around  1500.  This village is near other villages, Dhawani, Chilha, Gamhariya, Karma.  Gamahariya is a panchayat of this village.

Villages in Rohtas district